Noel William Rohleder (born 18 December 1933) is a former Australian rules footballer who played with South Melbourne in the Victorian Football League (VFL).

Aged 16 years and 251 days, he was the youngest player to have played for South Melbourne. His brother Kevin Rohleder played 5 games for St Kilda.

Notes

External links 

Living people
1933 births
Australian rules footballers from Victoria (Australia)
Sydney Swans players